Venancio José Murcía (born 19 April 1976 in Cartagena, Murcia) is a retired Spanish sprinter who specialized in the 100 and 200 metres.

He finished seventh in the 4 × 100 m relay at the 1997 World Championships, together with teammates Frutos Feo, Jordi Mayoral and Carlos Berlanga.

His personal best 100 metres time is 10.17 seconds, achieved in August 2000 in Castellón. His personal best 200 metres time is 20.59 seconds, achieved in September 1997 in Madrid.

References

sports-reference

1976 births
Living people
Spanish male sprinters
Athletes (track and field) at the 1996 Summer Olympics
Athletes (track and field) at the 2000 Summer Olympics
Olympic athletes of Spain
Sportspeople from Cartagena, Spain
Spanish sportspeople of Equatoguinean descent
Mediterranean Games silver medalists for Spain
Mediterranean Games medalists in athletics
Athletes (track and field) at the 1997 Mediterranean Games